Samuel Storrow Sumner (1842–1937) was a United States Army general during the Spanish–American War, Boxer Rebellion, and Philippine–American War.

Early life
Sumner was born in Carlisle Barracks, Pennsylvania on February 6, 1842. Samuel's name commemorates his father's mentor and friend, Samuel Appleton Storrow (1787–1837), who served as a Judge Advocate in the U. S. Army from 1816 to 1821.

Civil War service
He served in the Union army during the Civil War. Shortly after the outbreak of the war he was commissioned a 2nd lieutenant in the 2nd Cavalry Regiment on June 11, 1861. He was transferred to the 5th Cavalry on August 3, 1861. For much of the war, he served on the staff of his father, General Edwin V. Sumner. He fought at the Battle of Fair Oaks, Virginia on June 1, 1862.

He was promoted to 1st lieutenant on July 17, 1862 and to aide de camp with the rank of captain on August 20 of the same year. He fought at the Battle of Antietam on September 17, 1862. He was assigned as a captain in the 5th Cavalry on March 30, 1864. He received brevets (honorary promotions) to 1st lieutenant, captain and major during the war for "gallant and meritorious service".

Post Civil War
After the war's end, Sumner stayed in the army and served in the cavalry during the Indian Wars as did his brother Civil War brevet brigadier general Edwin Vose Sumner, Jr. He was promoted to major of the 8th Cavalry on April 2, 1879. He received a brevet to lieutenant colonel on February 27, 1890 for "gallant service in action against Indians at Summit Springs, Colorado on 11 July 1869. He was promoted to lieutenant colonel of the 6th Cavalry on February 18, 1891 and to colonel in command of the 6th Cavalry on May 23, 1896.

Spanish–American War
When the Spanish–American War broke out in May 1898, Sumner was appointed brigadier general of volunteers and placed in command of the 1st Brigade, Cavalry Division, V Corps. He was sent to Cuba with the corps and led his brigade into action at the Battle of Las Guasimas. When Joseph Wheeler fell ill, Sumner temporarily assumed command of the Cavalry Division. He was still in command of the division when the fighting at the Battle of San Juan Hill began. However, it is said that when Wheeler heard the sound of battle he rose from his sick bed and rushed to take command of the division. Sumner returned to command his brigade for the rest of the battle and in the Siege of Santiago. In September, he was appointed major general of volunteers. He was discharged from the volunteers and reverted to his Regular Army rank of colonel on April 15, 1899.

After the war with Spain ended, Sumner served as a military attaché to American Embassy in London. During the Boxer Rebellion, Summer was again in field command and led a brigade in the China Relief Expedition.

He then was sent to the Philippines and commanded the 1st District, Department of Southern Luzon during the Philippine–American War. On February 4, 1901, he was promoted to brigadier general in the Regular Army.

He was a companion of the District of Columbia Commandery of the Military Order of the Loyal Legion of the United States. He was also a companion of the Pennsylvania Commandery of the Military Order of Foreign Wars.

He continued to serve in the Army until his retirement at the age of 64 in 1906. He died on July 26, 1937, at his home in Brookline, Massachusetts, and is buried in Arlington National Cemetery.

Awards
 Civil War Campaign Medal
 Indian Campaign Medal
 Spanish Campaign Medal
 China Campaign Medal
 Philippine Campaign Medal

References

External links
 S.S. Sumner in Warrenton, Va., 1862 (3rd on right, counterclockwise)
 

American military personnel of the Spanish–American War
American military personnel of the Philippine–American War
United States Army generals
American military personnel of the Boxer Rebellion
People from Carlisle, Pennsylvania
People from Brookline, Massachusetts
1842 births
1937 deaths
Burials at Arlington National Cemetery
Sumner family
People of Pennsylvania in the American Civil War
Military personnel from Pennsylvania